Paul Wernick is a Canadian television/movie screenwriter and producer. He is best known for writing the screenplays to the 2016 superhero film Deadpool and its 2018 sequel with his creative partner Rhett Reese.

Career

Early career
Wernick has produced several network reality shows, including CBS's Big Brother 2 and ABC's I'm a Celebrity... Get Me out of Here!. Wernick has won three Emmy Awards for his work in news, which included producing stints at KVOA, KOLD, KTVK, KSL and KCAL.

Big Brother 2 inspired Wernick and Rhett Reese, a screenwriter friend of his brother back from Phoenix, Arizona, where both attended high school - Reese was a senior on Wernick's freshman year - to create their own take on reality television, The Joe Schmo Show.

Film
Wernick and Reese's first feature collaboration was the 2009 film Zombieland, which they created and also executive-produced. The film was released by Sony Pictures in theaters October 2, 2009, and went on to become one of the highest grossing zombie movies of all-time.

Wernick and Reese followed Zombieland with Paramount Pictures’ G.I. Joe: Retaliation, starring Dwayne Johnson, Channing Tatum, and Bruce Willis, which was released on March 27, 2013.  The sequel outperformed the original, grossing  $375 million.

Paul Wernick wrote and executive produced 20th Century Fox's Deadpool, along with Reese. Deadpool starred Ryan Reynolds, and was directed by Tim Miller. The R-rated film was released on February 12, 2016. Its opening weekend was the highest grossing of all time for R-Rated films, and it went on to gross more than $780 million worldwide. The team's next project, sci-fi thriller Life, was released in March 2017. The film was directed by Daniel Espinosa, produced by Skydance, and through Sony Pictures, with Ryan Reynolds, Jake Gyllenhaal, and Rebecca Ferguson starring. They wrote Deadpool 2 in 2018, which like its predecessor was released to positive reviews.

Wernick and Reese were announced as the co-screenwriters of the feature film adaptation of Cowboy Ninja Viking. Reportedly Chris Pratt will star in the film as well as also serve as executive-produce.  The film is being distributed by Universal Pictures. Their original science fiction spec screenplay Epsilon was sold to Sony Pictures; with contracts to co-produce in partnership with Michael De Luca.  Wernick and Reese recently optioned Thomas Oliver's book, The Real Coke, The Real Story, about the failed launch of New Coke. The pair will write and produce the project.

Television
Wernick and Reese first collaborated in 2001, creating, writing, and executive-producing  The Joe Schmo Show for Spike TV.  The series drew Spike’s highest-ever ratings.  Joe Schmo was named to numerous Best Of lists, including Time's "Top 10 TV Shows of 2003" and Entertainment Weeklys "50 Best TV Shows Ever on DVD."

The Schmo format has sold internationally, in the UK, France, Spain, and New Zealand. Wernick and Reese followed up with Invasion Iowa, a high-concept, high-stakes comedy hybrid starring William Shatner. The show premiered on Spike in the first quarter of 2005 and aired internationally immediately following. Invasion Iowa was released on DVD in May, 2009.

Reese and Wernick created and executive-produced Stuck on ODB, a comedy reality show starring Ol' Dirty Bastard (ODB) of the Wu Tang Clan for Spike TV. ODB died before the show ever aired.

FilmographyFilmTelevision'

References

External links

Check out these Exclusive stills from ZOMBIELAND starring Woody Harrelson, Jesse Eisenberg, Emma Stone and Abigail Breslin!
Reality Television Has Finally Met Its Match: An Interview with Joe Schmo Creators Rhett Reese and P

Canadian television producers
Canadian television writers
Place of birth missing (living people)
Year of birth missing (living people)
Living people
Skydance Media people
Canadian male television writers